Stadelhofen may refer to:

 Stadelhofen, a community in the district of Bamberg and a member of the administrative community of Steinfeld in Germany.
 Stadelhofen, a locality in Zürich, Switzerland
Zürich Stadelhofen FB railway station, the terminus of the Forchbahn railway
Zürich Stadelhofen railway station, a railway junction station of the S-Bahn Zürich in Zürich
Kantonsschule Stadelhofen, a gymnasium located nearby
Stadelhoferplatz, a square nearby and part of southern Sechseläutenplatz plaza